The Fieseler F 3 Wespe ("Wasp") was a German aircraft developed in the early 1930s by Gerhard Fieseler. Little history of the aircraft remains due in part to destruction of records and documents during World War II.

Design and development
The aircraft configuration, either inspired by or copied from Alexander Lippisch, featured a flying wing design with winglets and two radial engines. The seven cylinder Pobjoy R engines were installed in a push-pull configuration and provided 75-85 horsepower each. A two bladed propeller manufactured by Gustav Schwarz can be seen in some of the few remaining photos. The design featured a canard and folding wings. Different versions of the aircraft had either a fully enclosed "greenhouse" style canopy or two open cockpits. After determining the aircraft to be generally uncontrollable, the project was transitioned to the Rhön-Rossitten Gesellschaft (RRG). The design was further evolved into the Lippisch Delta IV.

References

Further reading
Fieseler F 3 "Wespe" (RRG "Delta IV"), Gunter Frost, JET+PROP Nr. 3, 2004

1930s German experimental aircraft
Tailless aircraft
Low-wing aircraft
Fieseler aircraft
Aircraft first flown in 1932
Twin-engined push-pull aircraft